Mojtaba Ramezani; is an Iranian football midfielder who currently plays for Iranian football club in the Persian Gulf Pro League.

Club career

Early years
He started his career in Qaemshahr with several clubs. In Qaemshahr Division 1 and Division 2, he helped Esteghlal Lammuk to be promoted to Mazandaran Super League.

Nassaji
After success in Nassaji technical test, he was signed by the club on loan from Esteghlal Lammuk. At his first season in Nassaji he helped Mohammad Abbaszadeh to score 18 times in 2013–14 Azadegan League. He had offers from Tractor Sazi & Rah Ahan after shining in Division 1, but he signed a contract with Nassaji for another year. He started the season in Nassaji's line up and scored 4 times until mid-season. In winter transfer window he had an offer from Saba Qom but Nassaji denied any offer received for him and forced him to stay at their club. He finished the season with 19 appearances and 5 goals.

Saipa
Ramezani joined Saipa in summer 2014. He made his debut for Saipa against Gostaresh Foulad as a substitute for Mehdi Torabi in August 2014.

Club career statistics

References

External links
 Mojtaba Ramezani at PersianLeague.com
 Mojtaba Ramezani at IranLeague.ir

Living people
Iranian footballers
Nassaji Mazandaran players
Saipa F.C. players
1989 births
Association football midfielders
People from Qaem Shahr
Sportspeople from Mazandaran province